Nicholas Moore (1918–1986) was an English poet.

Nicholas or Nick Mo(o)re may also refer to:
Nicholas Moore (priest) (1887–1985), New Zealand catholic priest
Nicholas Ruxton Moore (1756–1816), U.S. Representative
pseudonym of Mario Bianchi (born 1939), Italian film director
Nick Moore (Canadian football) (born 1986), Canadian football player
Nick Moore (musician) (born 1983), American musician
Nick Moore (filmmaker), British film director
Nicholas More (died 1689), first chief justice of the Province of Pennsylvania
Nicholas More (MP) (fl. 1390-1397), English politician from Wells, Somerset
Nicholas W. Moore, Australian businessman
Nick Moore (American football) (born 1992), NFL long snapper
Nicky Moore (1947–2022), English singer